Imperial Noble Consort Jingmin (敬敏皇贵妃; Pinyin: Jìngmǐn huáng guìfēi; 17th century – 20 August 1699) was a concubine of the Kangxi Emperor.

Life

Family background 
Imperial Noble Consort Jingmin's personal name was not recorded in history. Her family belong to the Bordered White Banner.

Father: Haikuan (海寬) served as military commander

Kangxi Era 
It is unclear when Imperial Noble Consort Jingmin was born or when she entered the palace. But on the first day of October in the twenty-fifth year of Kangxi (1686), she gave birth to the thirteenth prince Yinxiang. On November 27 in the twenty-sixth year of Kangxi, she gave birth to Princess Wenke of the Second Rank (和碩溫恪公主). And on the thirtieth year of Kangxi, she gave birth to her last child, Princess Dunke of the Second Rank (和碩敦恪公主).

In the thirty-eighth year of Kangxi, Concubine Min died in Wulong Pavilion in Beihai. In July of that year, the Kangxi Emperor instructed the Minister of Ritual to promote Concubine Min to Consort Min (敏妃) posthumously. In September of the same year, Kangxi's third son Yunzhi was demoted to beile for not attending the funeral for Consort Min.

Records show that Consort Min during the thirty-eighth year of Kangxi and was temporarily buried in the gazed flower gate in the Emperor's mausoleum. The reason for this arrangement is unknown.

On the twenty-sixth of the first month of the first year of Yongzheng, Emperor Yongzheng instructed the ministry of rites to posthumously appoint Consort Min as Dowager Imperial Noble Consort (皇考皇贵妃). On June 20, her posthumous title was changed to Imperial Noble Consort Jingmin (敬敏皇贵妃). On the first day of September, Imperial Noble Consort Jingmin along with the Kangxi Emperor and Empress Xiaogongren were buried in the Jingling Mausoleum in Zunhua City, Hebei Province.

Titles 
During the reign of the Shunzhi Emperor (r. 1643–1661) or the Kangxi Emperor (r. 1661–1722):
Lady Janggiya
During the reign of the Kangxi Emperor (r. 1661–1722):
Concubine Min  (敏嬪; from 1689), fifth rank consort
Consort Min (敏妃; fom 1699)
During the reign of the Yongzheng Emperor (r. 1722–1735):
Imperial Noble Consort Huangkao (皇考皇贵妃; from 26 January 1723)
Imperial Noble Consort Jingmin (敬敏皇贵妃; from 30 June 1723)

Issues 
As Mistress:
 Yinxiang, Prince Yixian of the First Rank (怡賢親王 胤祥; 16 November 1686 – 18 June 1730), Kangxi Emperor's 22nd (13th) son
Princess Wenke of the Second Rank (和碩溫恪公主; 31 December 1687 – 27 July 1709), Kamgxi Emperor's 13th daughter
As Concubine Min: 
Princess Dunke of the Second Rank (和碩敦恪公主; 3 February 1691 – 2 January 1710), Kangxi Emperor's 15th daughter

Film and television 
 Played by Huang Shengyi in the 2013 drama The Palace
 Played by Yang Rong and Sun Yaoqi in the 2013 drama I am a mad man

References 

 " Manuscripts of Qing History · Biography I · Empresses"
 "The King's Assembly of the Qing Dynasty"

Chinese concubines
Consorts of the Kangxi Emperor
Year of birth unknown
Year of death missing